Clarence "Waxey" Williams (January 27, 1866 – September 23, 1934) was an American baseball catcher who played for predecessor teams to the Negro leagues. He joined the Cuban Giants, the first black professional team, during their first season. He played at least 20 years for major teams. He was born in Harrisburg, Pennsylvania.
 
In his time the Cuban Giants played in otherwise all-white leagues during 1887, 1889, and 1890, but Williams and Frank Grant played on the otherwise white Harrisburg team in the Eastern Interstate League. (Harrisburg and the Giants battled for the pennant.)

References

 
(Riley.) Clarence Williams, Personal profiles at Negro Leagues Baseball Museum. – identical to Riley (confirmed 2010-04-16)

External links

Cuban Giants players
Cuban X-Giants players
New York Gorhams players
Philadelphia Giants players
Trenton Cuban Giants players
Harrisburg Ponies players
Ansonia Cuban Giants players
Baseball catchers
Baseball players from Harrisburg, Pennsylvania
1866 births
1934 deaths
20th-century African-American people